The Roman Catholic Diocese of Wanxian/Wanhsien is a diocese located in Wanxian (Chongqing) in the Ecclesiastical province of Chongqing in China.

History

 August 2, 1929: Established as Apostolic Vicariate of Wanxian (Ouan-hien; 萬縣) from the Apostolic Vicariate of Chongqing (Tchong-kin-fou; 重慶)
 April 11, 1946: Promoted as Diocese of Wanxian 萬縣

Special churches
Former Cathedral:
聖母始胎無原罪天主堂真原堂(Cathedral of the Immaculate Conception), Wanzhou

Leadership
 Bishops of Wanxian 萬縣 (Roman rite)
 Bishop Paul He Zeqing (December 13, 2008 – Present)
Bishop Joseph Xu Zhixuan (July 31, 1989 Appointed Coadjutor Bishop;succeeded as ordinary on Jan 10, 2001; Dec 8, 2008 Died)
 Bishop Matthias Duan Yinming (Tuan In-Min) (段蔭明) (June 9, 1949 – January 10, 2001)
 Bishop Francis Xavier Wang Zepu (Wang Tse-pu) (王澤浦) (April 11, 1946 – July 3, 1947)
 Vicars Apostolic of Wanxian 萬縣 (Roman Rite)
 Bishop Francis Xavier Wang Ze-pu (Wang Tse-pu) (王澤浦) (December 16, 1929 – April 11, 1946)

See also
 Anglican Diocese of Szechwan
 Catholic Church in Sichuan

References
 GCatholic.org
 Catholic Hierarchy
 UCAN Diocese Profile

Christianity in Chongqing
Roman Catholic dioceses in Sichuan
Roman Catholic dioceses in China
Christian organizations established in 1929
Roman Catholic dioceses and prelatures established in the 20th century